Helge Flo (born December 17, 1966) is a visually impaired Norwegian cross-country skier competing at the 2010 Winter Paralympics. He was a cross country skier.

References 

1966 births
Living people
Norwegian male cross-country skiers
Cross-country skiers at the 1998 Winter Paralympics
Cross-country skiers at the 2002 Winter Paralympics
Cross-country skiers at the 2006 Winter Paralympics
Cross-country skiers at the 2010 Winter Paralympics
Medalists at the 2006 Winter Paralympics
Medalists at the 1998 Winter Paralympics
Paralympic medalists in cross-country skiing
Paralympic silver medalists for Norway
Paralympic bronze medalists for Norway
Paralympic cross-country skiers of Norway
Paralympic gold medalists for Norway
Medalists at the 2002 Winter Paralympics